Jepkosgei or Chepkosgei is a surname of Kenyan origin that may refer to:

Janeth Jepkosgei (born 1983), Kenyan middle-distance runner
Jane Jepkosgei Kiptoo (born 1982), Kenyan female marathon runner
Joyciline Jepkosgei (born 1993), Kenyan long-distance runner
Mary Jepkosgei Keitany (born 1982), Kenyan marathon runner
Sally Jepkosgei Kipyego  (born 1985), Kenyan long-distance track runner

See also
Kosgei
Kipkosgei
Surnames of Kenyan origin

Kalenjin names